The battle of Nam Đông took place from July 5–6 1964 during the Vietnam War, when the Viet Cong (VC) and People's Army of Vietnam (PAVN) attacked the Nam Đông CIDG camp in an attempt to overrun it. During the battle, 57 South Vietnamese defenders, two Americans, an Australian Military advisor, and at least 62 attackers were killed.

Battle

The PAVN/VC struck at the camp at 02:30 on 5 July to achieve the element of surprise, and reached the outer perimeter where CIDG forces managed to hold out. At 04:00 the senior officer, Captain Roger Donlon, radioed for support and two hours later six HMM-162 helicopters carrying reinforcements escorted by two U.S. Army UH-1B helicopter gunships left Da Nang Air Base for Nam Dong, but on arriving over the camp they were unable to land due to intense fire and had to return to Da Nang.

A U.S. Army CV-2 Caribou managed to drop ammunition into the camp and Republic of Vietnam Air Force (RVNAF) A-1 Skyraiders carried out airstrikes on the PAVN/VC around the camp.

At 09:45 18 HMM-162 UH-34Ds escorted by four UH-1Bs and two RVNAF A-1s began landing a 93 man relief force and extracting the wounded. At 15:45 a further flight of 10 UH-34s delivered ammunition and equipment to the camp but by this time the battle was over.

Allied losses were two U.S., one Australian and 50 CIDG killed, while the PAVN/VC left 62 dead around the camp.

Aftermath

Captain Donlon became the first American to be awarded the Medal of Honor in Vietnam for killing two VC sappers and thereby preventing them from breaching the Nam Dong base, while sustaining shrapnel wounds in the process.

Warrant Officer Kevin Conway of the Australian Army Training Team Vietnam (AATTV) was killed in the assault. He was the first Australian to be killed in action in the Vietnam War. Master Sergeant Gabriel Alamo and Sergeant John L. Houston were also killed during the action on July 6, 1964. Alamo and Houston were posthumously awarded the Distinguished Service Cross. Sergeant Terrance D. Terrin, U.S. Army Green Beret medic, was awarded the Silver Star for his gallantry in the battle.

The Green Berets
A battle scene in the 1968 film The Green Berets was inspired by the battle of Nam Dong.

See also
Viet Cong and PAVN strategy and tactics
Battle of Wanat - U.S. forces repel insurgents from small outpost in 2008 battle in Afghanistan 
Battle for Hill 3234 - Soviet paratroopers repel Afghan insurgent forces dramatized in the 2005 movie The 9th Company.

References

External links
Origins of Special Forces

Nam Dong
1964 in Vietnam
Nam Dong
Nam Dong
Nam Dong
Nam Dong
July 1964 events in Asia
History of Quảng Nam province